Camille Joseph Etienne Roqueplan (18 February 1802/03, Mallemort - 29 September 1855, Paris) was a French Romantic painter of landscapes, genre and historical scenes.

Biography
From an early age, he displayed an aptitude for drawing, and would often correct his classmates. Around the age of eighteen, he began to take painting lessons. Oddly enough, when his father encouraged him to take up art as a profession, Camille hesitated because he wanted it to remain a pleasant pastime, not become a job. Soon, the lessons he felt forced to take caused him disgust and he took up the study of medicine.  

He got as far as the anatomy classes, which he found unappealing, and failed the examination. He then became a clerk in the Ministry of Finance, where his father worked, but this was also short-lived.

He decided to return to painting, studying landscape and figure drawing with some local artists. Following their advice, he found a position in the studios of Abel de Pujol at the École des Beaux-arts. One day, however, Pujol showed him a painting that he admired so much he despaired of ever being able to do as well and became discouraged enough to quit. It was only with great difficulty that his friends convinced him to continue. After leaving Pujol, he studied with Antoine Gros, who gave him very little encouragement, or even attention, but he remained with Gros for three years, perhaps because he was under less stress there.

After competing for the Prix de Rome, he decided to strike out on his own. At that time, he concentrated on landscape painting, which inspired him to take a trip to the Dauphiné. Many of his works are set there.

Later career

Upon his return to Paris, he held his first exhibit at the Salon in 1822, eventually winning a gold medal there. Despite his bad experiences as a student, he became a teacher at the École himself. Among his best-known students were Charles-Théodore Frère, Prosper Marilhat, Marie-Alexandre Alophe, Eugène Lami, Constant Troyon and Marie-Élisabeth Blavot. Later, in the 1830s, he produced historical paintings inspired by the novels of Walter Scott and painted battle-scenes at Versailles. In 1841, he created decorations for the ceiling of the library at the Palais du Luxembourg. From 1843, he returned to landscape painting and lived in the Pyrenees for several years for health reasons, where he produced scenes of peasant life.

His brother Nestor was a writer and theatrical director.

References

Further reading
 Germain Hédiard, Camille Roqueplan, L'Artiste (1893)

External links 

 My Daily Art Display (blog): Detailed biographical information which may include original research.
 ArtNet: more works by Roqueplan.
 Camille Roqueplan @ the Base Joconde
 Théophile Gautier: Camille Roqueplan. In:  Histoire du romantisme. G. Charpentier et Cie, libraires-editeures, 1874  Online

19th-century French painters
French male painters
1803 births
1855 deaths
French genre painters
History painters
19th-century French male artists